Kondamodalu is a village in Devipatnam Mandal, East Godavari district in the state of Andhra Pradesh in India.

Geography 

Demographics 
 India census, Kondamodalu had a population of 2039, out of which 959 were male and 1080 were female. The population of children below 6 years of age was 13%. The literacy rate of the village was 47%.

References 

Villages in Devipatnam mandal